Radio City may refer to:

Radio stations
 Radio City (Liverpool), an Independent radio station in Liverpool forming part of the Hits Radio Network
Greatest Hits Radio Liverpool & The North West a secondary station to the Liverpool-based Radio City, formerly Radio City 2
 Radio City 3, a defunct sister station to Radio City, carrying a localised output from The Hits
 Radio City Talk, a defunct speech-led sister station to Radio City.
 Radio City Tower, a radio and observation tower in Liverpool
 Radio City (pirate radio station), British
 Radio City (Bulgaria), Bulgarian CHR network station
 Radio City (Indian radio station), India
 Radio City, Maribor, Slovenia
 Radio City 1386AM, a hospital radio station in Swansea, Wales

Other

 Radio City Music Hall, a theater that is known for hosting the Rockettes
 NBC Radio City Studios, the broadcast complex that gave its name to the Music Hall
 Radio City (album), 1974 album by Big Star
 Radio City Cinema (Tehran), a luxuries Cinema in Tehran in the 1970s

nl:Radio City